Zamin may refer to:

 Zameen (novel), alternatively spelled as Zamin, an Urdu novel by Khadija Mastoor

Places in Iran
 Zamin-e Anjir
 Zamin-e Bandabad-e Barik
 Zamin-e Dar
 Zamin-e Hansin
 Zamin-e Hasan
 Zamin Lashkari
 Zamin-e Molla
 Zamin-e Sabah
 Zamin-e Siah
 Zamin-e Taghuk
 Zamin-e Tuman

See also 
 
 Zaamin (disambiguation)
 Zameen (disambiguation)